The men's team pursuit event was part of the track cycling programme at the 1924 Summer Olympics.

The field consisted of 10 teams of four, with each team representing a different country. The Vélodrome de Vincennes track was a  loop. The format was a 4-kilometre (8 lap) team pursuit.

Results

Source:

First round

The top finisher in each heat qualified for the quarterfinals. All other teams were eliminated. Italy and Denmark received byes.

 Heat 1

 Heat 2

 Heat 3

 Heat 4

 Heat 5

 Heat 6

Quarterfinals

The six winners of the first round competed in the quarterfinals. Again, the winner of each heat advanced; this time, a fastest loser also qualified.

 Quarterfinal 1

 Quarterfinal 2

 Quarterfinal 3

Semifinals

The four remaining teams competed in two semifinals, with the winners advancing to the final and the losers facing off in a bronze medal race.

 Semifinal 1

 Semifinal 2

Bronze medal race

Belgium defeated France.

Final

Italy and Poland competed for the top two spots, with Italy taking the prime honors.

References

Men's team pursuit
Cycling at the Summer Olympics – Men's team pursuit